Albion is a census-designated place in Mendocino County, California, United States. Albion had a population of 153 at the 2020 census.

Toponym
Albion was named in 1844, as a reference to when Sir Francis Drake landed on the northern California coast and called it "New Albion". Albion was an ancient name for Britain, from the Latin word albus, meaning "white", a reference to the White Cliffs of Dover.

Geography
Albion lies directly on California's State Route 1 (Shoreline Highway) north of Elk and south of Mendocino and Little River. It lies just north of the intersection of State Route 1 with State Route 128. Albion Ridge Road leads east from the town center. The side roads on Albion Ridge Road are labeled from B through Q.

The nearest beaches include Navarro Beach to the south and Handley Beach at the head of Albion Ridge Road.

Vegetation includes coastal headlands, with California redwood forests and pygmy forests nearby.

Albion has two bridges, one spanning the Albion River and the other Little Salmon Creek. The Albion River Bridge, built in 1944 when steel and concrete were in short supply, remains as the last wooden bridge still in use on State Route 1.

The ZIP Code is 95410. The community is inside area code 707.

Schools
The town belongs to the Mendocino Unified School District and children attend Albion Elementary School or Mendocino K-8 School until third grade, then Mendocino K-8 School and Mendocino High School.

The Albion Biological Field Station, a facility of Pacific Union College (a private Seventh-day Adventist college) is located in Albion, on the south bank of the Albion River; it offers college biology courses to Pacific Union students as well as shorter courses for elementary and high school students and seniors.

Demographics

The 2010 United States Census reported that Albion had a population of 168. The racial makeup of Albion was 150 (89.3%) White, 1 (0.6%) African American, 4 (2.4%) Native American, 5 (3.0%) Asian, 0 (0.0%) Pacific Islander, 0 (0.0%) from other races, and 8 (4.8%) from two or more races. Hispanic or Latino of any race were 4 persons (2.4%).

The Census reported that 156 people (92.9% of the population) lived in households, 12 (7.1%) lived in non-institutionalized group quarters, and 0 (0%) were institutionalized.

There were 82 households, out of which 13 (15.9%) had children under the age of 18 living in them, 20 (24.4%) were opposite-sex married couples living together, 8 (9.8%) had a female householder with no husband present, 5 (6.1%) had a male householder with no wife present.  There were 8 (9.8%) unmarried opposite-sex partnerships, and 1 (1.2%) same-sex married couples or partnerships. 36 households (43.9%) were made up of individuals, and 15 (18.3%) had someone living alone who was 65 years of age or older. The average household size was 1.90.  There were 33 families (40.2% of all households); the average family size was 2.55.

The population was spread out, with 20 people (11.9%) under the age of 18, 10 people (6.0%) aged 18 to 24, 40 people (23.8%) aged 25 to 44, 64 people (38.1%) aged 45 to 64, and 34 people (20.2%) who were 65 years of age or older. The median age was 50.3 years. For every 100 females, there were 115.4 males.  For every 100 females age 18 and over, there were 108.5 males.

The homeowner vacancy rate was 1.8%; the rental vacancy rate was 17.6%.  105 people (62.5% of the population) lived in owner-occupied housing units and 51 people (30.4%) lived in rental housing units.

Politics

See also
Albion River Inn
Fensalden Inn
Albion River Railroad

References

External links 

 Albion California Travel Directory
 Albion, CA Travel Information

Populated coastal places in California
Census-designated places in Mendocino County, California
Census-designated places in California